John Denby may refer to:
James Denby, mistakenly listed as John, English footballer
John Denby (luger),  British luger
John Denby (MP for Wallingford), in 1419 and 1426, MP for Wallingford (UK Parliament constituency)
John Denby (MP for Ludgershall), in 1421 and 1423, MP for Ludgershall (UK Parliament constituency)